Barbara Mutch (born 27 October 1953) is a Canadian rower. She competed in the women's coxed four event at the 1976 Summer Olympics.

References

1953 births
Living people
Canadian female rowers
Olympic rowers of Canada
Rowers at the 1976 Summer Olympics
Sportspeople from Cornwall, Ontario
20th-century Canadian women